The Muslim conquest of Kerman and Sistan took place around 644 AD, during the caliphate of ʿUthmān ibn ʿAffān. Rāshidūn forces under ʿAbdullah ibn ʿAbdullah ibn ʿItbān and Suhail ibn ʿĀdi killed the Sassanid governor of Kerman and took the towns of Bam, Bardsīr, Jīroft and Sīrjān.

References 

7th century in Asia
Khuzestan
History of Kerman Province
Kerman